Kemijärvi railway station is a railway station located in Kemijärvi, Finland. It was opened in 1934 when the railway was extended from Rovaniemi to Kemijärvi. It is operated by the VR Group (the Finnish State Railways), and maintained by RHK, the Finnish Transport Agency.

In September 2006, the station was closed when the direct overnight train service between Kemijärvi and Helsinki was controversially withdrawn, with VR stating that its new sleeping car trains could not operate with the diesel locomotives needed for the non-electrified railway north of Rovaniemi. However, in March 2008 the overnight train to/from Helsinki was restored using a generator car that could provide hotel power behind a diesel. On 11 March 2014, electrification reached the station from Rovaniemi, allowing seamless service to Helsinki and making Kemijärvi the northernmost electrified point of the Finnish railway system.

At the end of winter 2014, VR was operating one daily overnight passenger train (with sleeping cars) from Kemijärvi to and from Helsinki Central railway station. There are currently no daytime services, but bus services to and from Rovaniemi are available, operated on behalf of VR.

The railway extends beyond Kemijärvi to Salla, but the segment between Isokylä and Salla was closed in December 2012. There are plans, however, to reopen the line and continue it all the way to Murmansk as the Northeast Passage opens to traffic.

Its rooms originally intended for use by passenger services include a waiting room, café and post office; its staff amenities include a pair of offices and personal rooms for use by the train dispatcher and stationmaster, a break room, and an apartment for use by a janitor. The building bears a resemblance to that of Rovaniemi, built earlier in 1952–53.

References

External links

 VR – Kemijärvi station

Railway station
Railway stations in Lapland (Finland)
Railway stations opened in 1934
1934 establishments in Finland